William Claremont (died 1832) was a British stage actor who spent many years in the companies of the leading London theatres at Covent Garden, Haymarket and Drury Lane. He was born William Cleaver in London as the son of a shop assistant and a deliveryman and was originally apprenticed to a linen merchant. His first known acting roles were in Margate in 1792 and from 1793 he was a regular at Covent Garden. During the summers he also appeared at Richmond and Birmingham. He continued at Covent Garden until 1805 when he switched to Drury Lane and remained there until 1822.

Selected roles
 Conrade in Much Ado About Nothing by William Shakespeare (1793)
 Villager in The Vespers of Palermo by Felicia Hemans (1823)
 Tentile in Cortez by James Planché (1823)
 Weilberg in The Three Strangers by Harriet Lee (1825)

References

Bibliography
 Highfill, Philip H, Burnim, Kalman A. & Langhans, Edward A. A Biographical Dictionary of Actors, Actresses, Musicians, Dancers, Managers and Other Stage Personnel in London, 1660-1800: Cabanel to Cory. SIU Press, 1975.

18th-century British people
19th-century British people
English male stage actors
18th-century British male actors
18th-century English male actors
19th-century British male actors
19th-century English male actors
1832 deaths
Male actors from London
Year of birth missing